The House of Sanseverino (or San Severino) is the name of an old and important Italian noble family, that was very prominent in the Kingdom of Naples.

History 
The family owned 300 fiefs, 40 counties, nine marquessates, twelve duchies and ten principalities, primarily located in Calabria, Campania, Basilicata, and Apulia. From this family emerged cardinals, viceroys, marshals and condottieri.

See also 
 Sanseverino

References

External links
 
 Sanseverino family information